Richard "Rick" Ney (May 21, 1961 – April 9, 2017) was an American professional darts player who competed in the 1980s and 1990s.

Career
Ney reached the final of the prestigious News of the World Darts Championship in 1986 losing to Bobby George. He made four appearances in the World Professional Darts Championship with his best result coming in 1988 when he beat Magnus Caris and Chris Johns, and then lost to Bob Anderson in the semifinals. Ney became only the third player from outside the United Kingdom to reach the last four of the World Championship in the ten-year history of the tournament.

All his World Championship defeats came at the hands of some legends of darts, including two losses to five-time world champion Eric Bristow.

Ney quit BDO in 1991.

Death
Ney died in a vehicle accident on April 9, 2017.

World Championship results

BDO
1984: 2nd round (lost to Eric Bristow 0–4) (sets)
1987: 2nd round (lost to Bristow 0–3)
1988: Semi-finals (lost to Bob Anderson 0–5)
1989: 2nd round (lost to Dave Whitcombe 0–3)

Career finals

Independent major finals: 1 (1 runner-up)

References

External links
Rick Ney profile at American Darts Organization

1961 births
2017 deaths
American darts players
British Darts Organisation players
People from Schuylkill County, Pennsylvania